The 1985 USA Outdoor Track and Field Championships took place between June 15–17 at IUPUI Track and Soccer Stadium on the campus of Indiana University-Purdue University Indianapolis in Indianapolis, Indiana. The meet was organized by The Athletics Congress.  The decathlon and heptathlon were held the two days after the main meet.  Marathon National Championships were held at the California International Marathon in December.

The most notable event at this meet was Willie Banks' world record in the triple jump.  The jump occurred almost by accident as the always exuberant Banks took his attempt and rushed out of the pit in order to cheer for his Athletics West teammate Louise Romo, who was finishing her 800 meters race.

Results

Men track events

Men field events

Women track events

Women field events

See also
United States Olympic Trials (track and field)

References

 Results from T&FN
 results

USA Outdoor Track and Field Championships
Usa Outdoor Track And Field Championships, 1985
Track and field
Track and field in Indiana
Outdoor Track and Field Championships
Outdoor Track and Field Championships
Sports in Indiana